Eridu (Cuneiform: NUN.KI ; Sumerian: eridugki; Akkadian: irîtu) was a Sumerian city located at Tell Abu Shahrain (Arabic;) an archaeological site in southern Mesopotamia.  Eridu was long considered the earliest city in southern Mesopotamia. Located 12 kilometers southwest of Ur, Eridu was the southernmost of a conglomeration of Sumerian cities that grew around temples, almost in sight of one another. These buildings were made of mud brick and built on top of one another. With the temples growing upward and the village growing outward, a larger city was built. In Sumerian mythology, Eridu was originally the home of Enki, later known by the Akkadians as Ea, who was considered to have founded the city. His temple was called E-Abzu, as Enki was believed to live in Abzu, an aquifer from which all life was believed to stem.

Foundation,tricultures and decline

Eridu is one of the earliest settlements in the region, founded c. 5400 BC, close to the Persian Gulf near the mouth of the Euphrates River. Excavation has shown that the city was founded on a virgin sand-dune site with no previous occupation. Eridu was formed at the confluence of three separate ecosystems, supporting three distinct lifestyles, that came to an agreement about access to fresh water in a desert environment. 
 Fisher-hunter cultures of the Arabian littoral living in reed houses
 Samarra culture Living in rectangular houses
 Nomads living in tents in semi-desert areas.
All three cultures seem implicated in the earliest levels of the city.  The oldest agrarian settlement seems to have been based upon intensive subsistence irrigation agriculture derived from the Samarra culture to the north, characterised by the building of canals, and mud-brick buildings.  The urban settlement was centered on a large temple complex built of mudbrick, within a small depression that allowed water to accumulate.

Jacobsen describes that "Eridu was for all practical purposes abandoned after the Ubaid period", although it had recovered by Early Dynastic II as there was a Massive Early Dynastic II palace (100 m in each direction) partially excavated there. 

Eridu was abandoned for long periods, before it was finally deserted and allowed to fall into ruin in the 6th century BC. The encroachment of neighbouring sand dunes, and the rise of a saline water table, set early limits to its agricultural base so in its later Neo-Babylonian development, Eridu was rebuilt as a purely temple site, in honour of its earliest history.

Arabian littoral culture

The finding of extensive deposits of fishbones associated with the earliest levels  shows a continuity of the Abzu cult associated later with Enki and Ea.  Because of accumulation of silt at the shoreline over the millennia, the remains of Eridu are now some distance from the gulf at Abu Shahrain in Iraq.

According to Gwendolyn Leick,  The fisher-hunter cultures of the Arabian littoral were responsible for the extensive middens along the Arabian shoreline, and may have been the original Sumerians. They seem to have dwelt in reed huts.

Samarra cultures
Kate Fielden reports "The earliest village settlement (c. 5000 BC) had grown into a substantial city of mudbrick and reed houses by c. 2900 BC, covering ". Mallowan writes that by the Ubaid period, it was as an "unusually large city" of an area of approx. 20–25 acres, with a population of "not less than 4000 souls". Ruth Whitehouse called it "a Major Early Dynastic City".  By c. 2050 BC the city had declined; there is little evidence of occupation after that date. Eighteen superimposed mudbrick temples at the site underlie the unfinished Ziggurat of Amar-Sin (c. 2047–2039 BC). The ziggurat was dated to Amar-Sin based on an inscribed brick. It has since been suggested that the brick was re-used by Nur-Adad (1801 - 1785 BC) one of whose year names was "Year the temple of Enki in Eridu was built".

Goddess worship theory
Piotr Steinkeller has hypothesised that the earliest divinity at Eridu was a Goddess, who later emerged as the Earth Goddess Ninhursag (Nin = Lady, Hur = Mountain, Sag = Sacred), with the later growth in Enki as a male divinity the result of a hieros gamos, with a male divinity or functionary of the temple.

Site Location

Eridu is located on a natural hill in a basin approximately 15 miles long and 20 feet deep, which is separated from the Euphrates by a sandstone ridge called the Hazem   This basin, the As Sulaybiyat Depression (formerly: Khor en-Nejeif), becomes a seasonal lake during the rainy season from November to April.  During this period, it is filled by the discharge of the Wadi Khanega.  This seasonal lake (Arabic: Sebkha) is thought to be the origin of the Abzu in Sumerian thought.

Archaeology
The site contains 8 mounds:
Mound 1 - Abū Šahrain, 580 meters x 540 meters in area NW to WE, 25 meters in height, Enki Temple,  Ur III Ziggurat (É-u6-nir) Sacred Area, Early Dynastic plano-convex bricks found, Ubaid Period cemetery
Mound 2 - 350 meters x 350 meters in area, 4.3 meters in height, 1 kilometer N of Abū Šahrain, Early Dynastic Palace, remnants of city wall built with plano-convex bricks
Mound 3 - 300 × 150 meters in area, 2.5 meters high, 2.2 kilometers SSW of Abū Šahrain, Isin-Larsa pottery found
Mound 4 - 600 × 300 meters in area, 2.5 kilometers SW of Abū Šahrain, Kassite pottery found
Mound 5 - 500 × 300 meters in area, 3 meters high, 1.5 kilometers SE of Abū Šahrain, Neo-Babylonian and Achaemenid periods
Mound 6 - 300 × 200 meters in area, 2 meters high, 2.5 kilometers SW of Abū Šahrain
Mound 7 - 400 × 200 meters in area, 1.5 meters high, 3 kilometers E of Abū Šahrai
Mound 8 - Usalla, flat area, 8 kilometers NW of Abū Šahrain, Hajj Mohammed and later Ubaid

The site at Tel Abu Shahrain is located in Dhi Qar Governorate, Iraq) near Basra.  It has been excavated four times. It was initially excavated by John George Taylor in 1855, R. Campbell Thompson in 1918, and H. R. Hall in 1919. An interesting find by Hall was a piece of manufactured blue glass which he dated to around 2000 BC. The blue color was achieved with cobalt, long before this technique emerged in Egypt. Excavation there resumed from 1946 to 1949 under Fuad Safar and Seton Lloyd of the Iraqi Directorate General of Antiquities and Heritage. They found a sequence of 14 superseding temples and an Ubaid Period graveyard with 1000 graves of mud-brick boxes oriented to the southeast. These archaeological investigations showed that, according to A. Leo Oppenheim, "eventually the entire south lapsed into stagnation, abandoning the political initiative to the rulers of the northern cities", probably as a result of increasing salinity produced by continuous irrigation, and the city was abandoned in 600 BC. In 1990 the site was visited by A. M. T. Moore who found two areas of surface pottery kilns not noted by the earlier excavators. In October 2014 Franco D’Agostino visited the site in preparation for the coming resumption of excavation, noting a number of inscribed Amar-Sin brick fragments on the surface. In 2019, excavations at Eridu were resumed by a joint Italian, French, and Iraqi effort.

Tablet controversy
In March 2006, Giovanni  Pettinato and S. Chiod from Rome's La Sapienza University claimed to have discovered 500 Early Dynastic cuneiform tablets on the surface at Eridu. The tablets were said to be from 2600 to 2100 BC and be part of a library. A team was sent to the site by Iraq's State Board of Antiquities and Heritage which found no tablets. Nor was there a permit to excavate at the site issued to anyone.

Myth and legend 
 
In some, but not all, versions of the Sumerian King List, Eridu is the first of five cities where kingship was received before a flood came over the land. The Sumerian King List mentions two kings of Eridu: Alulim, who ruled for 28,800 years, and Alalngar, who ruled for 36,000 years. Adapa, a man of Eridu, is depicted as an early culture hero. He was considered to have brought civilization to the city as the sage of King Alulim.

In Sumerian mythology, Eridu was the home of the Abzu temple of the god Enki, the Sumerian counterpart of the Akkadian god Ea, god of deep waters, wisdom and magic. Like all the Sumerian and Babylonian gods, Enki/Ea began as a local god who, according to the later cosmology, came to share the rule of the cosmos with Anu and Enlil. His kingdom was the sweet waters that lay below earth (Sumerian ab=water; zu=far).

The stories of Inanna, goddess of Uruk, describe how she had to go to Eridu in order to receive the gifts of civilization. At first Enki, the god of Eridu, attempted to retrieve these sources of his power but later willingly accepted that Uruk now was the centre of the land. This seems to be a mythical reference to the transfer of power northward.

Babylonian texts talk of the foundation of Eridu by the god Marduk as the first city, "the holy city, the dwelling of their [the other gods] delight".

In the court of Assyria, special physicians trained in the ancient lore of Eridu, far to the south, foretold the course of sickness from signs and portents on the patient's body and offered the appropriate incantations and magical resources as cures.

Lament for Eridu
The fall of early Mesopotamia cities and empires was typically believed to be the result of falling out of favor with the gods. A genre called City Laments developed during the Isin-Larsa period, of which the Lament for Ur is the most famous. These laments had a number of sections (kirugu) of which only fragments have been recovered. Unlike Ur or Akkad we don't have a good idea of how Eridu actually fell, or when other than in the Early Dynastic period. The Sumerian King List simply says "Then Eridug fell and the kingship was taken to Bad-tibira".

Architecture

The urban nucleus of Eridu was Enki's temple, called House of the Aquifer (Cuneiform:  , E2.ZU.AB; Sumerian: e2-abzu; Akkadian: bītu apsû), which in later history was called House of the Waters (Cuneiform: , E2.LAGAB×HAL; Sumerian: e2-engur; Akkadian: bītu engurru). The name refers to Enki's realm. His consort Ninhursag had a nearby temple at Ubaid.

During the Ur III period Ur-Nammu had a ziggurat built over the remains of previous temples.

Aside from Enmerkar of Uruk (as mentioned in the Aratta epics), several later historical Sumerian kings are said in inscriptions found here to have worked on or renewed the e-abzu temple, including Elili of Ur; Ur-Nammu, Shulgi and Amar-Sin of Ur-III, and Nur-Adad of Larsa.

House of the Aquifer (E-Abzu)

See also

Abzu
Cities of the Ancient Near East
Lake Hammar
Tepe Gawra

References

Further reading
Seton Lloyd, "Ur-al 'Ubaid, 'Uqair and Eridu. An Interpretation of Some Evidence from the Flood-Pit", Iraq, British Institute for the Study of Iraq, vol. 22, Ur in Retrospect. In Memory of Sir C. Leonard Woolley, pp. 23–31, (Spring - Autumn, 1960)
Lloyd, S., "The Oldest City of Sumeria: Establishing the origins of Eridu.", Illustrated London News Sept. 11, pp. 303-5, 1948.
Joan Oates, "Ur and Eridu: the Prehistory", Iraq, vol. 22, pp. 32-50, 1960

Mahan, Muhammed Seiab. "Topography of Eridu and its defensive fortifications." ISIN Journal 3, pp. 75-94, 2022
Van Buren, E. Douglas. “Discoveries at Eridu.” Orientalia, vol. 18, no. 1, 1949, pp. 123–24
"The Ruins of Eridu, 2400 B. C.", Scientific American, vol. 83, no. 20, pp. 308–308, 1900

External links

Inana and Enki, The Electronic Text Corpus of Sumerian Literature, Oxford UK, JAB, editor: translation
Sumerian Eridu City-State and Ubaid Phase 1 (Tell Abu Shahrain) in Iraq The History of the Ancient Near East
Iraq launches campaign to secure archaeological sites in Dhi Qar Al-Mashareq 2021-09-24 

Populated places established in the 6th millennium BC
Populated places disestablished in the 6th century BC
1855 archaeological discoveries
Archaeological sites in Iraq
Dhi Qar Governorate
Former populated places in Iraq
Sumerian cities
Samarra culture
Ubaid period